The 2012 Everett Raptors season was the team's third season as a professional indoor football franchise and third in the Indoor Football League (IFL). One of sixteen teams competing in the IFL for the 2012 season, the Everett, Washington-based Everett Raptors were members of the Intense Conference.

Under the leadership of owner/general manager Mike Berry and head coach Sean Ponder, the team played their home games at the Comcast Arena at Everett in Everett, Washington.

Schedule
Key:

Regular season
All start times are local time

Roster

Standings

References

Everett Raptors
Everett Raptors
American football in Washington (state)